Mattubby Creek is a stream in the U.S. state of Mississippi.

Mattubby is a name derived from the Chickasaw language purported to mean "the one who kills all". Variant names are "Mattuby Creek", "Matubba Creek", "Matubbie Creek", and "Matubby Creek".

References

Rivers of Mississippi
Rivers of Chickasaw County, Mississippi
Rivers of Monroe County, Mississippi
Mississippi placenames of Native American origin